John Thomas Foster (1747 – 10 October 1796), of Dunleer, was an Irish politician.

He was the son of Rev Thomas Foster, Rector of Dunleer and Dorothy née Burgh. Foster was elected member to the Irish House of Commons for Dunleer in 1776 and held this seat until 1783. Subsequently he represented Ennis until 1790.

Foster married 1776, Lady Elizabeth Hervey daughter of 4th Earl of Bristol; they separated 1781. Children:
 Frederick Thomas Foster (3 October 1777 – 1853) MP for Bury St Edmunds.
 Elizabeth Foster (17 November 1778 – 25 November 1778).
 Augustus John Foster, later Sir Augustus Foster, 1st Baronet (December 1780 – 1848).

References

1747 births
1796 deaths
Irish MPs 1776–1783
Irish MPs 1783–1790
Politicians from County Louth
Members of the Parliament of Ireland (pre-1801) for County Louth constituencies
Members of the Parliament of Ireland (pre-1801) for County Clare constituencies